Humanity... is an album featuring songs composed by Shinji Orito, Magome Togoshi, Mitsuru Sekiyama, Yasushi Tanno, and Shigeru Kiyokawa. The album was first released on August 10, 2001 at Comiket 60 in Japan by Key Sounds Label bearing the catalog number KSLA-0001. The album contains one disc with ten tracks; eight of the ten are sung by Hidetsuna Fujita, and Mina Minomo, and the lyrics for the songs were written by Jun Maeda, Tanno, Fujita, and Kazumi Ōtsuka. Excluding the last track, "Tori no Uta (Bossanova Version)", which is a remix of a song originally featured in Key's visual novel Air, none of the other tracks are related to visual novels by Key.

Track listing

References

External links
Key Sounds Label's official website 

2001 albums
Albums by Japanese artists
Key Sounds Label